The men's 800 metres event at the 2000 Summer Olympics as part of the athletics programme was held at Stadium Australia on Saturday 23 September, Monday 25 September, and Wednesday 27 September 2000. Sixty-one athletes from 46 nations competed. The maximum number of athletes per nation had been set at 3 since the 1930 Olympic Congress. The event was won by Nils Schumann of Germany, the first men's 800 metres championship for a German runner and the first medal in the event for the nation since 1952. Denmark (Wilson Kipketer's silver) and Algeria (Djabir Saïd-Guerni's bronze) each won their first medal in the men's 800 metres.

Summary

Germany's Nils Schumann upset Denmark's world record holder and world champion Wilson Kipketer. The race was one of the closest in Olympic 800 meter history as the first three were separated by a mere 0.08 second and the first five by 0.32 second. It was suggested Kipketer made a tactical error by not forcing the pace.

The final was slow, with André Bucher leading the first lap in 53.43.  Down the back stretch Andrea Longo moved shoulder to shoulder with Bucher and at the 600 meter mark, just under 1:20 Longo dropped his shoulder forcing Bucher into the infield.  Longo charged into the lead around the final turn with world record holder in next to last place chasing the notable young kicker Yuriy Borzakovskiy.  Kipketer had to go out to lane 4 to try to get around the wall of runners ahead of him with Djabir Saïd-Guerni in lane 5 trying to get around Kipketer.  Longo faded with 30 meters to go, with Nils Schumann in perfect position to pick up the pieces, holding off the late rush on the outside to take the gold.  For the interference, Longo was disqualified.

Background

This was the 24th appearance of the event, which is one of 12 athletics events to have been held at every Summer Olympics. Only two finalists from 1996 returned, but they were the top two: gold medalist Vebjørn Rodal of Norway and silver medalist Hezekiél Sepeng of South Africa. Wilson Kipketer, who had been prevented from competing in the 1996 Games due to his change of nationality from Kenya to Denmark, was the favorite after having won the past three world championships and broken the world record twice. Challengers included Sepeng, 1998 European champion Nils Schumann of Germany, Yuriy Borzakovskiy of Russia, and André Bucher of Switzerland (a semifinalist in Atlanta).

Azerbaijan, Bahrain, Belarus, Macedonia, Moldova, and Uganda appeared in the event for the first time. Great Britain made its 23rd appearance, most among all nations, having had no competitors in the event only in the 1904 Games in St. Louis.

Qualification

Each National Olympic Committee was permitted to enter up to three athletes that had run 1:46.30 or faster during the qualification period. The maximum number of athletes per nation had been set at 3 since the 1930 Olympic Congress. If an NOC had no athletes that qualified under that standard, one athlete that had run 1:47.20 or faster could be entered.

Competition format

The men's 800 metres again used a three-round format, the most common format since 1912 though there had been variations. The "fastest loser" system introduced in 1964 was used for the first two rounds. There were eight first-round heats, each with 7 or 8 athletes; the top two runners in each heat as well as the next eight fastest overall advanced to the semifinals. There were three semifinals with 8 athletes each (except that one had an extra runner due to an advancement by obstruction rule in the first round); the top two runners in each semifinal and the next two fastest overall advanced to the eight-man final.

Records

Prior to the competition, the existing World and Olympic records were as follows.

No world or Olympic records were set during the competition. The following national records were established during the competition:

Schedule

All times are Australian Eastern Standard Time (UTC+10)

Results

Round 1 

The first round was held on Saturday, 23 September 2000.

Heat 1

Heat 2

Heat 3

Heat 4

Heat 5

Heat 6

Heat 7

Heat 8

Overall results for round 1

Semifinals

Semifinal 1

Semifinal 2

Semifinal 3

Overall results for semifinals

Final  

Source: Official Report of the 2000 Sydney Summer Olympics

References

External links
 Men's 800m final – IAAF report

Athletics at the 2000 Summer Olympics
800 metres at the Olympics
Men's events at the 2000 Summer Olympics